Paudie Lannon (born 1956) is an Irish retired hurler who played as a midfielder for the Kilkenny senior team.

Born in Thomastown, County Kilkenny, Lannon first arrived on the inter-county scene at the age of sixteen when he first linked up with the Kilkenny minor team, before later joining the under-21 side. He made his senior debut during the 1981 championship. Lannon enjoyed a brief inter-county career, during which time he won one All-Ireland medal and one National Hurling League medal.

At club level Lannon played with Thomastown.

Lannon retired from inter-county hurling following Kilkenny's defeat of Cork in the 1983 All-Ireland final.

Honours

Team

Kilkenny
All-Ireland Senior Hurling Championship (2): 1982 (sub), 1983
Leinster Senior Hurling Championship (2): 1982 (sub), 1983 (sub)
National Hurling League (2): 1981-82 (sub), 1982-83

References

1956 births
Thomastown hurlers
Kilkenny inter-county hurlers
All-Ireland Senior Hurling Championship winners
Living people